Jason Hooper is an Australian former rugby league footballer who played for the Illawarra Steelers, St George Illawarra Dragons and St Helens.

A former Junior Kangaroo, Hooper completed six seasons in the NRL between 1997 and 2002 before embarking on a long and successful career in Super League for another five seasons.

Having won Super League VI, St Helens contested the 2003 World Club Challenge against 2002 NRL Premiers, the Sydney Roosters.
Hooper played for St Helens at loose forward in their 2006 Challenge Cup Final victory against the Huddersfield Giants. St Helens reached the 2006 Super League Grand final to be contested against Hull F.C. and Hooper played at loose forward in St Helens' 26–4 victory. 
Hooper announced his retirement at the age of 29 because of a long-term shoulder injury.

References

External links
Jason Hooper Player Profile
Saints.org Biography
Illawarra Steelers Profile
St Helens sign Aussie Hooper
St Helens 35-30 Bradford
Hooper ready for St Helens return
St Helens 56-10 Leeds
SAINTS STAR CALLS IT QUITS
Ian Millward tribute to Hooper

1977 births
Living people
Australian rugby league players
St Helens R.F.C. players
Illawarra Steelers players
St. George Illawarra Dragons players
Rugby league locks
Rugby league five-eighths
Rugby league players from New South Wales